Laura  Stevenson is the sixth album by Laura Stevenson. The album was released by Don Giovanni Records on August 6, 2021.

Track listing

References

Laura Stevenson albums
2021 albums
Don Giovanni Records albums